Current Drug Metabolism is a peer-reviewed medical journal covering the study of drug metabolism. It was established in 2000 and is published 10 times per year by Bentham Science Publishers. The editor-in-chief is Ming Hu  (University of Houston). According to the Journal Citation Reports, the journal has a 2019 impact factor of 2.960.

Abstracted & Indexed in 
This journal has been indexed in:
 Science Citation Index-Expanded (SciSearch)
 Journal Citation Reports/Science Edition
 Index to Scientific Reviews®
 Biochemistry & Biophysics Citation IndexTM
 Current Contents® - Life Sciences BIOSIS
 BIOSIS Previews
 BIOSIS Reviews Reports and Meetings
 MEDLINE/PubMed/Index Medicus
 Scopus
 EMBASE/Excerpta Medica
 Chemical Abstracts Service/SciFinder
 ProQuest
 ChemWeb
 Google Scholar
 PubsHub
 MediaFinder®-Standard Periodical Directory
 Genamics JournalSeek
 J-Gate
 CNKI Scholar
 Suweco CZ
 TOC Premier
 EBSCO
 British Library and Ulrich's Periodicals Directory

References

External links 

Pharmacology journals
Bentham Science Publishers academic journals
Publications established in 2000
English-language journals